Apagomerina lampyroides is a species of beetle in the family Cerambycidae. It was described by Martins and Galileo in 2007. It is known from Brazil.

References

lampyroides
Beetles described in 2007